The discography of Lisa Hannigan includes her many side projects and collaborations with a number of other musicians and her solo career, which currently consists of three albums and 12 singles. Hannigan is a multi-instrumentalist who can play electric guitar, bass guitar, Harmonium, melodica, banjo, thumb piano, mandolin, ukulele, glockenspiel and drums as well as being a talented vocalist. She began contributing backing vocals to  Damien Rice's band in Dublin in 2001 and toured with him across Europe and North America. Rice dismissed her at Munich, Germany in 2007, and in 2008 she released her debut solo album, titled Sea Sew. Sea Sew has been nominated for the Choice Music Prize and led to Hannigan receiving two nominations at the 2009 Meteor Awards.

Hannigan has also been involved in numerous side projects. She provided backing vocals on one track from Mic Christopher's Skylarkin' album which was finished by Christopher's friends after his death in 2001. She performs three tracks which feature on the soundtrack of the film Goldfish Memory alongside Damien Rice, had a UK hit with the Burmese protest song "Unplayed Piano" and she also features on the albums Burn the Maps by The Frames and Not Fade Away by David Kitt. The singer also worked on self-titled album of The Cake Sale project, a 2007 Oxfam collaboration by mainly Irish musicians, on which she provided vocals on three tracks, including the "Some Surprise" duet with Gary Lightbody, which later featured on the U.S. television series Grey's Anatomy.

Hannigan has performed a number of covers, including "Get the Party Started" by P!ink, which featured as a duet with Damien Rice on Even Better Than the Real Thing Vol. 1 a charity compilation CD released in Ireland in 2003 and "Upside Down" by Diana Ross, which featured on the 2008 charity album Even Better Than the Disco Thing. She also contributed to the 2009 charity album, Sparks n' Mind, released in aid of Aware.

Albums

Studio albums

Live albums

Singles

Damien Rice collaborations
Lisa appears on the Damien Rice albums O (2002) and 9 (2006) and collaborated with him on numerous other projects.

Side projects / guest appearances / miscellaneous works

Notes

See also
 Song of the Sea

References

External links 
 Official site
 Lisa Hannigan articles at The Guardian
 Lisa Hannigan on Soundcloud

Discographies of Irish artists
Folk music discographies